Ines Müller,  (born 2 January 1959 in Grimma, Muldentalkreis, Saxony), is a German track and field athlete who represented East Germany in the shot put during the 1980s.  Her biggest success was the bronze medal in the 1987 World Championship.

International Competitions 

Müller represented the Empor Rostock sport club.  During her sporting career she was 1.82 meters tall and weighed 90 kilograms.

References

External links
 
 

1959 births
Living people
People from Grimma
East German female shot putters
German female shot putters
Olympic athletes of East Germany
Athletes (track and field) at the 1980 Summer Olympics
Athletes (track and field) at the 1988 Summer Olympics
World Athletics Championships athletes for East Germany
World Athletics Championships medalists
European Athletics Championships medalists
Universiade medalists in athletics (track and field)
Universiade silver medalists for East Germany
World Athletics Indoor Championships medalists
Medalists at the 1981 Summer Universiade
Sportspeople from Saxony